Murder 101 may refer to:

Films
 Murder 101 (1991 film), a TV film starring Pierce Brosnan
 Murder 101 (2014 film), an American horror film
 Murder 101 (film series), a 2006–2008 series of four Hallmark mystery films with Dick and Barry Van Dyke

Television episodes
 "Murder 101" (Magnum, P.I.), an episode of Magnum, P.I.
 "Murder 101" (The Pretender), an episode of The Pretender
 "Murder 101" (The Sentinel), an episode of The Sentinel